Chernomen Glacier is the  long and  wide glacier on Barison Peninsula, Graham Coast on the west side of Antarctic Peninsula, situated south-southwest of Butamya Glacier and west-southwest of Talev Glacier.  It drains northwestwards, and flows into Leroux Bay southeast of Eijkman Point.

The glacier is named after the settlement of Chernomen in medieval Southern Bulgaria.

Location
British mapping in 1971.

See also
 List of glaciers in the Antarctic
 Glaciology

Maps
 British Antarctic Territory.  Scale 1:200000 topographic map. DOS 610 Series, Sheet W 65 64.  Directorate of Overseas Surveys, Tolworth, UK, 1971.
 Antarctic Digital Database (ADD). Scale 1:250000 topographic map of Antarctica. Scientific Committee on Antarctic Research (SCAR). Since 1993, regularly upgraded and updated.

References
 Bulgarian Antarctic Gazetteer Antarctic Place-names Commission (Bulgarian)
 Basic data (English)
 Chernomen Glacier SCAR Composite Gazetteer of Antarctica

External links
 Chernomen Glacier. Copernix satellite image

Bulgaria and the Antarctic
Glaciers of Graham Coast